Martin Bayer (born 20 December 1972) is a Slovak skier. He competed in the Nordic combined events at the 1992 Winter Olympics and the 1994 Winter Olympics.

References

External links
 

1972 births
Living people
Slovak male Nordic combined skiers
Olympic Nordic combined skiers of Czechoslovakia
Olympic Nordic combined skiers of Slovakia
Nordic combined skiers at the 1992 Winter Olympics
Nordic combined skiers at the 1994 Winter Olympics
Sportspeople from Poprad